Helicobacter trogontum is a bacterium in the Helicobacteraceae family, Campylobacterales order. It was first isolated from rat intestine. It is Gram-negative, its cells  are rod-shaped with pointed ends, and its protoplasmic cylinder is entwined with periplasmic fibers. It is microaerophilic. The type strain is LRB 8581 (= ATCC 700114).

References

Further reading

Moura, S. B., et al. "Hepatic changes in mice chronically infected with Helicobacter trogontum." Brazilian journal of medical and biological research 36.9 (2003): 1209–1213.

External links

LPSN
Type strain of Helicobacter trogontum at BacDive -  the Bacterial Diversity Metadatabase

Campylobacterota
Bacteria described in 1996